Ephestiodes mignonella is a species of snout moth in the genus Ephestiodes. It was described by Harrison Gray Dyar Jr. in 1908. It is found in Texas.

References

Moths described in 1908
Phycitinae